Mohsen Mohammed Hasan Mohammed Qarawi (born 15 May 1989) is a Yemeni professional footballer who plays as a midfielder for Al-Saqr and the Yemeni national team.

He appeared on 13 May 2017, in an unofficial friendly match against Egypt in a 1–0 loss.

He officially debuted on 5 September 2017 at the 2019 AFC Asian Cup qualification held in the United Arab Emirates, with a 2–2 draw against the Philippines.

In 10 September 2019, Qarawi scored his first goal for Yemen in a 2–2 draw against Singapore in the 2022 FIFA World Cup qualification in Qatar.

International goals
Scores and results list Yemen's goal tally first.

References

External links
 

Living people
1989 births
Association football midfielders
Yemeni footballers
Yemen international footballers
Al-Saqr SC players